Pomonok is a working class neighborhood in the New York City borough of Queens. This large public housing development in South Flushing was built in 1949 on the former site of Pomonok Country Club. The name comes from a Native American word for eastern Long Island, and means either "land of tribute" or "land where there is travelling by water". 

Pomonok is part of Queens Community District 8.

History 

The Pomonok Country Club was a golf course in Pomonok between 1886 and 1949. The golf course was located between Kissena Boulevard and 164th Street, just to the south of Horace Harding Boulevard (now the Long Island Expressway) and to the east of Queens College. The club was established in 1886 by members of the Flushing Athletic Club in Flushing and moved to the Kissena Boulevard location in 1921. Devereux Emmet designed the golf course. The golf course hosted the PGA Championship in 1939, which Henry Picard won. The members disbanded and sold the course in 1949.  Part of the site today contains the Electchester cooperative housing development, Pomonok public housing and an extension of Parsons Boulevard.

In 1992, New York City settled a lawsuit brought on behalf of 100,000 families who claimed that the city had steered all white families applying for public housing into Pomonok and had provided that project with higher standards of care and maintenance than projects inhabited by majority Black and Hispanic families.

Electchester housing complex 
In Pomonok, there is also Electchester, a cooperative housing complex at Jewel Avenue and Parsons Boulevard in Pomonok, which was established by Harry Van Arsdale, Jr. and Local 3 of the International Brotherhood of Electrical Workers in 1949, when Van Arsdale worked with the Joint Industry Board of the Electrical Industry to purchase  of the former Pomonok Country Club and build apartment buildings. 5,550 people live in about 2,500 units in 38 buildings, many of which are six-story brick structures. It is served by Public School 200, which is on land donated by Electchester. The union provided the majority of the mortgage. New York state offered tax abatements. Electchester was classified as a "limited dividend nonprofit", subject to state regulations. The first families paid $475 per room for equity shares, and carrying charges of $26 per month per room, on apartments ranging from three and a half to five and a half rooms.

Both housing complexes are patrolled by the NYPD's 107th Precinct. There is also an NYPD PSA-9 Housing Police Unit station located in the Pomonok Houses.

Health 
The nearest hospitals are Queens Hospital Center and New York–Presbyterian Hospital Queens.

Education 
Nearby are major facilities such as Queens College, St. John's University, Touro College, Rabbinical Seminary of America, and many public and private schools. CUNY Law School, formerly in this area, moved to the Long Island City neighborhood of Queens in May 2012. 

Queens Public Library has a branch in Pomonok.

Transportation 
MTA Bus Company routes  serve Pomonok. The  run express from Pomonok to Midtown. The Whitestone Expressway connects Flushing north to the Bronx, south to the Van Wyck Expressway to John F. Kennedy International Airport, and to the Grand Central Parkway and LaGuardia Airport. Main Street is a major commercial street, as is Kissena Boulevard.

Notable people
People who were born in, residents of, or otherwise closely associated with Pomonok (including the Pomonok and Electchester houses) include:
 Gary Ackerman (born 1942), former U.S. Representative from New York, serving from 1983 to 2013.
 Barry Grodenchik (born 1960), council member representing the 23rd District of the New York City Council.
 Michael Simanowitz (1971–2017), member of the New York State Assembly.
 Harry Van Arsdale Jr. (1905-1986), labor, civil rights and community leader in New York City, who was behind the development of Electchester.
 Bob Weinstein (born 1954), film producer.
 Harvey Weinstein (born 1952), film producer.

See also
List of Queens neighborhoods
Paumanok
Paumanok Path

References
 

Neighborhoods in Queens, New York
Flushing, Queens